Hennadiy Horbenko (born 22 September 1975) is a Ukrainian former hurdler who competed in the 2000 Summer Olympics.

References

1975 births
Living people
Ukrainian male hurdlers
Olympic athletes of Ukraine
Athletes (track and field) at the 2000 Summer Olympics
Universiade medalists in athletics (track and field)
Universiade gold medalists for Ukraine